Rueben Burgess (born 30 September 1966) is a British sprint canoer who competed in the late 1980s and early 1990s. He was eliminated in the repechages of the K-4 1000 m event at the 1988 Summer Olympics in Seoul. Four years later in Barcelona, Burgess was eliminated in the semifinals of the K-2 1000 m event.

References
Sports-reference.com profile

1966 births
Canoeists at the 1988 Summer Olympics
Canoeists at the 1992 Summer Olympics
Living people
Olympic canoeists of Great Britain
British male canoeists